James Aloysius Hoare, CFC (1813 - 1902 was the third Superior General of the Congregation of Christian Brothers. He succeeded Michael Paul Riordan to the position in 1862. He stepped down in 1880 and was succeeded by Anthony Maxwell.

Death 
Hoare died in 1902, and is buried in the Christian Brothers Cemetery in Marino, Dublin, Ireland.

References 

1813 births
1902 deaths
Congregation of Christian Brothers
Superiors general
Irish Christian Brothers